Felice Placido Borel (5 April 1914 – 21 January 1993) was an Italian football player who played as a striker. He was a member of the Italy national football team that won the 1934 FIFA World Cup.

Club career
Borel was born in Nice, France. During his career, he played for Juventus and cross-city rivals Torino in Serie A and, in Serie B, for Alessandria, and finally for S.S.C. Napoli, where he finished his career.

He scored 157 goals for Juventus, winning three Serie A titles (1933, 1934, and 1935) and a Coppa Italia (1938) during his time with the club, as well as the Serie A top-scorer award on two occasions (1933 and 1934); he is currently Juventus's sixth highest goal scorer. During his second spell with the club in the 1940s, he held the position of player-manager.

He still holds the record for most goals, in winning the Capocannoniere/Top scorer title, in Serie A while playing for Juventus with 31 goals.
Allthough Ferenc Hirzer still holds the record for most goals in winning the Capocannoniere/Top scorer title, in the Best Italian League while playing for Juventus with 35 goals (in only 24 matches) but then it was called Prima Divisione.

International career
Borel made three appearances for the Italy national team between 1933 and 1934, scoring his only international goal on his debut against Hungary on 22 November, in Budapest, during the gold winning 1933-35 Central European International Cup campaign. He was part of the 1934 FIFA World Cup winning national team, appearing once throughout the tournament, during the quarter-final victory over Spain on 1 June.

Style of play
Nicknamed farfallino ("little butterfly," in Italian), Borel usually played as a centre-forward, and is regarded as one of Italy's and Juventus's greatest forwards of all time. He was known for his speed, movement, shooting, goalscoring, dribbling, team-play, and technical ability. In his later career he usually played as an inside forward or mezzala, or even as an offensive–minded central midfielder. Despite his ability, however, he was also injury prone.

After retirement
During the 1958–59 season, he was technical director of Catania.

Personal life
Felice's older brother Aldo Borel played football professionally, spending 10 seasons in the Serie A, and their father Ernesto Borel played for OGC Nice, AS Cannes and Juventus in the 1900s and 1910s, and later also served as a manager. To distinguish the brothers, Aldo was known as Borel I and Felice - as Borel II.

Honours
Juventus
Serie A: 1932–33, 1933–34, 1934–35
Coppa Italia: 1937–38

International
Italy
 FIFA World Cup: 1934
 Central European International Cup: 1933-35

Individual
Serie A Top-scorer: 1932–33 (29 goals), 1933–34 (31 goals)

References

External links
 La Gazzetta dello Sport

1914 births
1993 deaths
Footballers from Nice
1934 FIFA World Cup players
Italian footballers
Italy international footballers
French footballers
French people of Italian descent
Association football forwards
Serie A players
Serie B players
Juventus F.C. players
Torino F.C. players
U.S. Alessandria Calcio 1912 players
S.S.C. Napoli players
FIFA World Cup-winning players
French emigrants to Italy